XHTIM-FM is a commercial radio station located in Tijuana, Baja California, Mexico broadcasting on 90.7 MHz. XHTIM is owned by MVS Radio and airs a regional Mexican music format branded as "La Mejor".

History
XHTIJ-FM 97.7 received its concession in July 1990 but signed on in 1998. It was owned by Carlos Armando Madrazo y Pintado and was eventually sold to Sociedad Mexicana de Radio de Baja California, which in turn sold the station to MVS. In 1999, the call sign was changed to XHTIM-FM, which had been the call sign on 91.7 (renamed XHGLX-FM at that time).

In 2010, classical music station XHLNC-FM moved from 90.7 to 104.9.  That allowed XHTIM-FM to move to the vacated 90.7 frequency on higher power. The transmitter was also moved from the MVS studios in the Agua Caliente neighborhood of Tijuana to Cerro Colorado.  However, the 90.7 frequency is also occupied by KPFK in Los Angeles which runs 110,000 watts from a tall tower.  That limits XHTIM-FM's coverage north of San Diego.

References

External links 
 

Radio stations in Tijuana
Regional Mexican radio stations
Radio stations established in 1990
MVS Radio
1990 establishments in Mexico